Ravenscroft School, also known as Chateau Nollman, is a historic school building located at Asheville, Buncombe County, North Carolina.  The oldest section was built about 1845, and is a two- to three-story brick building in the Greek Revival style.  It consists of a squat, three-story, pyramidal-roofed tower with projecting two-story rectangular wings.  The building has a number of later additions including a two-story brick wing and two-story frame wing.  It was originally built as a residence, and housed a school from 1856 to the turn of the 20th century.  It was used as a boarding or rooming house until 1977. The building is currently used as office space.

It was listed on the National Register of Historic Places in 1978. It is located in the Downtown Asheville Historic District.

References

School buildings on the National Register of Historic Places in North Carolina
Greek Revival architecture in North Carolina
School buildings completed in 1845
Buildings and structures in Asheville, North Carolina
National Register of Historic Places in Buncombe County, North Carolina
Historic district contributing properties in North Carolina